Lårdal is a village in Tokke Municipality in Vestfold og Telemark county, Norway. The village is the site of Lårdal Church, a school, and a fast food store. Previously, there was also a grocery store, but it closed because the local population couldn't support it. Lårdal is also home to the former journalist and television presenter Bjørn Honerød. The village was historically the administrative centre of the old Lårdal Municipality from 1838 until its dissolution in 1964.

Name
The village (originally the parish) is named after the old Laardal farm since the first Lårdal Church was built there. Historically, the municipality name was spelled "Laurdal" (although the parish name goes back centuries as Laugerdal). From 1884-1920, it was spelled "Laardal". Since 1921, it has been spelled "Lårdal".

Notable people

References

Tokke